The Yucatan flycatcher (Myiarchus yucatanensis) is a species of bird in the family Tyrannidae.

It is endemic to the Yucatan Peninsula of Mexico and the northern bordering parts of Belize and Guatemala.

It is a typical Myiarchus flycatcher; partially crested with a brown to gray back and head, a rufous tail and yellow to pale underparts. It is closely related to and similar in appearance to the dusky-capped flycatcher (M. tuberculifer), brown-crested flycatcher (M. tyrannulus) and the great crested flycatcher (M. crinitus). These species are best distinguished by voice.

Its natural habitats are subtropical or tropical dry forests and heavily degraded former forest.

References

External links

 
 
 
 
 
 
 
 

Yucatan flycatcher
Birds of the Yucatán Peninsula
Birds of Belize
Yucatan flycatcher
Taxonomy articles created by Polbot